The 2022 Letran Knights men's basketball team represented Colegio de San Juan de Letran in the 98th season of the National Collegiate Athletic Association in the Philippines. The men's basketball tournament for the school year 2022-23 began on September 10, 2022, at the Smart Araneta Coliseum, and the host school for the season is Emilio Aguinaldo College.

The Knights, the Season 97 champions, began their campaign on September 14, 2022, against JRU Heavy Bombers instead of its earlier play date which was the opening day against the season's hosts EAC Generals due to four Letran players contracted COVID-19 virus.

The Knights finished the elimination round at second place with 13 wins and 5 losses. They have returned to the Finals for three straight seasons after defeating the Lyceum Pirates in the Final Four, 67-58.

The Knights went on to defeat the Benilde Blazers in three games to capture their 20th NCAA championship, clinching their first three straight titles in 38 years, since 1984. King Caralipio was named Finals Most Valuable Player and Mythical Five member.

Roster 

 Depth chart Depth chart

Roster changes 

The Knights lost four of its key players from last season's championship team. Season 97 Finals MVP Jeo Ambohot, Christian Fajarito, and Allen Mina were drafted last May 15, 2022 in the Philippine Basketball Association.

Meanwhile Rhenz Abando, the Season 97 MVP, has decided to forego his final year of eligibility and signed on as a professional basketball player for Anyang KGC in the Korean Basketball League.

Discipline 
Letran players Louie Sangalang and Brent Paraiso were suspended by the NCAA Management Committee headed by Commissioner Tonichi Pujante. Paraiso was caught throwing his elbow at the back of the head of Mapua’s Adrian Nocum, while Sangalang committed his second technical foul. Both players were suspended in one game. After further review by the league officials, the NCAA extended the suspension of Sangalang and Paraiso to two games.

Letran guard Kyle Tolentino served his one-game suspension in Game 2 of the NCAA Finals after occupying Benilde Blazers' Migs Oczon's landing spot in a three-point attempt that resulted in injury during their Game 1 matchup. 

Letran guard Kobe Monje served his one-game suspension in Game 2 of the NCAA Finals after he was ejected for elbowing Benilde Blazers' Macoy Marcos on the head during their Game 1 matchup.

Letran forward Paolo Javillonar was reprimanded for his unsportsmanlike behavior when he touched the private part of Will Gozum of the Benilde Blazers and warned that a repetition or commission of a similar offense will merit a stricter penalty. He is to issue a public apology and render community service "as a rehabilitative measure."

Letran guard and team captain Fran Yu served his one-game suspension in Game 3 of the NCAA Finals after he was ejected for elbowing Mark Sangco during their Game 2 matchup. Letran appealed the suspension to the Management Committee, but was denied.

NCAA Season 98 games results 

Elimination games are played in a double round-robin format. All games are aired on GTV and GMA Pinoy TV GMA News TV, and streamed online live via the NCAA Philippines website, NCAA Philippines Facebook page and YouTube channel, and GMA Sports’ Facebook and Twitter pages

Source: GMA Sports PH Facebook page

Awards

References 

Letran Knights basketball team seasons